Singapore International School, Mumbai is a co-educational school, offering IB PYP (International Baccalaureate Primary Years Programme), IGCSE (International General Certificate of Secondary Education) and IBDP (International Baccalaureate Diploma Programme) for both Indian and overseas students, though most are Indian or are of Indian origin. The name of the school is often abbreviated as 'SIS'. The school was established in 2007.

SIS has day boarding, weekly boarding, monthly boarding and term boarding for students. Its catering services are offered by Sodexo. While it has a large campus, it is located quite far away from central Mumbai. It is located next to Thakur Mall. It offers a variety of co-curricular activities like art, craft, pottery, dance, music and sports.

See also
 DPS International School Singapore - Indian school in Singapore

References

External links
 School website

International Baccalaureate schools in India
International schools in Mumbai
Singaporean international schools
Boarding schools in Maharashtra